Asbestos cement, genericized as fibro, fibrolite (short for "fibrous (or fibre) cement sheet") or AC sheet, is a building material in which asbestos fibres are used to reinforce thin rigid cement sheets. 

Although invented at the end of the 19th century, the material was adopted extensively during World War II to make easily-built, sturdy and inexpensive structures for military purposes, and it continued to be used widely following the war as an affordable external cladding for buildings.  Advertised as a fireproof alternative to other roofing materials such as asphalt, asbestos-cement roofs were popular, not only for safety but also for affordability. Due to asbestos-cement's imitation of more expensive materials such as wood siding and shingles, brick, slate, and stone, the product was marketed as an affordable renovation material. Asbestos-cement faced competition with the aluminum alloy, available in large quantities after WWII, and the reemergence of wood clapboard and vinyl siding in the mid to late twentieth century. 

Asbestos-cement is usually formed into flat or corrugated sheets, or into pipes, but can be molded into any shape that can be formed using wet cement. In Europe, cement sheets came in a wide variety of shapes, while there was less variation in the US, due to labor and production costs. Although fibro was used in a number of countries, it was in Australia and New Zealand that its use was most widespread. Predominantly manufactured and sold by James Hardie & Co. until the mid-1980s, fibro in all its forms was a very popular building material, largely due to its durability. The reinforcing fibres used in the product were almost always asbestos.

The use of fibro that contains asbestos has been banned in several countries, including Australia, but  the material was discovered in new components sold for construction projects.

Health effects 
When exposed to weathering and erosion, particularly when used on roofs, the surface deterioration of asbestos cement can be a source of airborne toxic fibres. Exposure to asbestos is directly related to a number of life-threatening diseases, including asbestosis, pleural mesothelioma (lung) and peritoneal mesothelioma (abdomen). Fibre cement sheet is still readily available, but the reinforcing fibres are now cellulose rather than asbestos. However, the name "fibro" is still applied to it for traditional reasons.

Products used in the building industry

 Roofs - most usually on industrial or farmyard buildings and domestic garages.
 Battens  wide ×  thick, used to cover the joints in fibro sheets.
 "Super Six" corrugated roof sheeting and fencing.
 Internal wet area sheeting, "Tilux".
 Pipes of various sizes for water reticulation and drainage. Drainage pipes tend to be made of pitch fibre, with asbestos cement added to strengthen.
 Moulded products ranging from plant pots to outdoor telephone cabinet roofs and cable pits.

Cleaning of asbestos cement
Some Australian states, such as Queensland, prohibit the cleaning of fibro with pressure washers, because it can spread the embedded asbestos fibres over a wide area. Safer cleaning methods involve using a fungicide and a sealant.

In popular culture
The 1973 song, "Way Out West", by The Dingoes, later covered by James Blundell & James Reyne, mentions living in a "house made of fibro cement". Fibro is also referred to several times on the Australian TV show Housos.

See also
 Cemesto
 Eternit
 Fibre cement
 Transite

References

External links 
 https://web.archive.org/web/20061117143719/http://www.nsw.gov.au/fibro/
 Advice if you have FAC in your home

Building materials
Asbestos